Fudbalski klub Boleč (Serbian Cyrillic: Фудбалски клуб Болеч) is a Serbian amateur football club based in Belgrade, more precisely from the Boleč suburban neighborhood. The club currently competes in the Belgrade Zone League) 4th tier of Serbian football.

Honours and achievements
 Second league of Belgrade - 6th rank 
 Group "Šumadija" Winners (1): 2013
 First league of Belgrade - 5th rank 
 Group "C" Winners (1): 2014

References 
 Table at the end of 2013-14 championship at Fudbalski savez Beograda 
 Profile, results and tables at www.srbijasport.net 
 Profile at Fudbalski savez Beograda 
 Profile at Beogradskifudbal.rs 
 Club page at Facebook
 Stadium at Wikimapia
 - Here you can find a stоry about club by Russian groundhopping blogger at Russianteam2 

Football clubs in Serbia
Football clubs in Belgrade
Association football clubs established in 1958
1958 establishments in Serbia